The JANET NRS (Name Registration Scheme) was a pseudo-hierarchical naming scheme used on British academic and research networks in the 1980s. It used a reverse domain name notation.

History 
It was proposed in 1983 and used until the superficially similar Internet Domain Name System was fully adopted.

Structure 
Any organisations not falling into these categories were given their own "second-level" name, e.g.

All NRS names had both a standard (long) and abbreviated (up to 18 characters) form. For example,  was the less widely used standard equivalent of the abbreviated name .

Comparison with DNS 
A principal difference with the Domain Name System was that the order of significance began with the most significant part (so called big-endian addresses). Also, NRS names were canonically written in upper case.

After Internet top-level domains were introduced from 1984, confusion was caused when the least significant part of an Internet address matched the most significant part of an NRS address and vice versa. The ccTLD ".cs" for Czechoslovakia came into use around 1990-2 until 1995. The classic joke was that e-mail intended for UK universities ended up in Czechoslovakia, since many JANET e-mail addresses were of the form universityname, where "CS" stood for Computer Science (department).

Another significant difference from the DNS was the concept of context to name lookups, e.g. 'mail' or 'file transfer'. This made the NRS more sophisticated than the DNS, permitting overloading of names.

Legacy 
JANET transitioned to using Internet protocols in 1991, and by 1994 the DNS had become the de facto standard for domain names on JANET. The final mail gateway was taken out of service by the end of 1997. 

The one remaining legacy of the NRS is the convention of using .uk for the Internet country code top-level domain (ccTLD), rather than .gb as specified by ISO 3166. The UK was the only country with a pre-existing national standard.

See also 

 Coloured Book protocols
 Internet in the United Kingdom § History
 Non-Internet email address

References

Sources 

 

Internet in the United Kingdom
Jisc
Wide area networks